Nell Craig (June 13, 1891 – January 5, 1965) was an American actress.

Partial filmography

 The Triflers (1920) 
 The Desperate Hero (1920)
 Passion's Playground (1920)
 Her First Elopement (1920) 
 The Queen of Sheba (1921)
 Remembrance (1922)
 The Abysmal Brute (1923)
 Abraham Lincoln (1924)
 A Boy of Flanders (1924)
 Cimarron (1931)
 Hold Your Man (1933)
 Beauty for Sale (1933)
 I'm No Angel (1933)
 The Cat's-Paw (1934)
 The Lemon Drop Kid (1934)
 Mad Love (1935)
 The Secret of Dr. Kildare (1939)
 Dr. Kildare's Strange Case (1940)
 Beyond Tomorrow (1940)
 Dr. Kildare Goes Home (1940)
 Nobody's Children (1940)
 Dr. Kildare's Crisis (1940)
 The People vs. Dr. Kildare (1941)
 Dr. Kildare's Wedding Day (1941)
 Dr. Kildare's Victory (1942)
 Calling Dr. Gillespie (1942)
 Dr. Gillespie's New Assistant (1942)
 Henry Aldrich Gets Glamour (1943)
 Dr. Gillespie's Criminal Case (1943)
 Henry Aldrich Plays Cupid (1944)
 3 Men in White (1944)
 Casanova Brown (1944)
 Fashion Model (1945)
 Between Two Women (1945)
 Black Market Babies (1945)
 Possessed (1947)
 Dark Delusion (1947)

References

External links

 

1891 births
1965 deaths
20th-century American actresses
American film actresses
People from Princeton, New Jersey
Actresses from New Jersey